Anabasis eugeniae, or Eugenia's anabasis, is a species of flowering plant in the family Amaranthaceae. It is endemic to the Nakhchivan Autonomous Republic in Azerbaijan, and is only known from the Julfa and Ordubad districts. It can be found on clay soils containing gypsum. It is threatened by overgrazing.

References

Amaranthaceae
Endemic flora of Azerbaijan
Barilla plants
Vulnerable flora of Asia